Siebenhaar is a German language surname. It is a nickname for a person with sparse hair growth– and may refer to:
Alex Siebenhaar (1927), Swiss rower
Heinrich Siebenhaar (1883–1946), German gymnast
Klaus Siebenhaar (1952), German university lecturer, publisher and cultural manag
Toni Siebenhaar (1923–2000), German rower
Willem Siebenhaar (1863–1936), social activist and writer in Western Australia

References 

German-language surnames
Surnames from nicknames